Enduro in its most basic definition is a type of mountain bike racing where the downhills are timed, and the uphills are mandatory but not timed. Riders are timed in stages that are primarily downhill, with neutral "transfer" stages in between. The transfer stages usually must be completed within a time-limit, but are not part of the accumulated time.

Background 
Enduros typically take place over one or two days, however, week-long competitions also exist such as the Trans-Savoie (France), the Andes Pacifico (Chile), and the Pisgah Stage Race (United States). A typical one-day enduro consists of 3 to 5 timed stages which take place on technically demanding, generally descending terrain, and often with sections of singletrack. These stages are linked by predominantly ascending "transfer" stages. Although a rider's performance on the physically demanding transfer stages does not affect his or her result, they often have a time-limit, or a latest allowed arrival-time for the start of the next stage.

According to the Enduro World Series 2015 Rule Book, a minimum of four special stages is required per event, a minimum of three different courses must be used, and the results will be calculated by adding all stage times together for each rider.

Enduro differs from cross-country (XC) racing which usually has more emphasis on cardiovascular fitness and less emphasis on technical ability, and pure downhill racing, which may contain little to no cross-country or climbing. Enduro's 'All Mountain' discipline therefore favours riders with a breadth of skill, on multi-discipline cycles. Lightweight XC bikes may lack sufficient suspension for fast downhill control, while full downhill bikes may not allow a rider to climb the uphill sections efficiently.

In some countries, the term enduro is considered a contraction of "endurance".

Origins 
The origins of enduro mountain bike racing come from some inspiration from both car rally such as the World Rally Championship and motorbike enduro racing. Mountain bike enduro is essentially the competitive side of the mountain biking format often referred to today as "All-Mountain". It arose from everyday mountain bike riding, which originally entailed riding to the top of the mountain and then racing to the bottom.

The first reported enduro race, using the modern format, was held in August 2003 in Val D’Allos. Earlier enduro-style local races were run in Italy, New Zealand, and the UK during the 80's and 90's. A precursor to the modern enduro format was the rallye format based on time stages and unlimited liaisons. However these races, located in France, tended to be more cross-country rather than downhill orientated.

See also
Cycling
Mountain biking
Mountain bike racing
Downhill mountain biking
Singletrack
Funduro
Glossary of cycling

References

External links
 Beginners Guide to Enduro: What the hell is it?
 Enduro, it’s only a name... right?

Mountain biking
Cycle sport